Glenea proserpina is a species of beetle in the family Cerambycidae. It was described by James Thomson in 1865. It is known from Laos, Sumatra, Malaysia and Borneo.

Varietas
 Glenea proserpina var. honora Pascoe, 1867
 Glenea proserpina var. sutureindicata Breuning, 1956

References

proserpina
Beetles described in 1865